Kimberly K. Smith (born March 27, 1966) is an American historian, and political science professor.

Life
She graduated from University of Michigan with a Ph.D., and from Boalt School of Law at the University of California at Berkeley.
She teaches at Carleton College.

She has published articles in the Journal of Political Philosophy, Wisconsin Journal of Environmental Law, Women's Studies, California Law Review, Rhetoric and Public Affairs, and Environmental Ethics.

Awards
 2001 Merle Curti Award by the Organization of American Historians, for The Dominion of Voice: Riot, Reason and Romance in Antebellum Politics

Selected works

References

External links
"Wendell Berry and the Agrarian Tradition:A Common Grace", University Press of Kansas 
"African American Environmental Thought", University Press of Kansas 

21st-century American historians
University of Michigan alumni
Carleton College faculty
1966 births
Living people
UC Berkeley School of Law alumni
American women political scientists
American political scientists
American women historians
21st-century American women writers